Block Island North Light (Lighthouse), built in 1867, is a historic lighthouse on Block Island, Rhode Island (New Shoreham).

History
The first light on the site was built in 1829. The current structure at Sandy Point is the fourth lighthouse built on the site and was made of granite and iron in 1867. The light was deactivated in 1973 and United States Fish and Wildlife Service acquired the lighthouse. The lighthouse was listed on the National Register of Historic Places in 1974.

After years of neglect, the lighthouse, along with two acres of land, was sold to New Shoreham in 1984 for $1 USD. Following much renovation by the North Light Commission, it was relighted in 1989, and a museum opened on the first floor in 1993. Then, in 2008 the light underwent restoration at Georgetown Ironworks in Massachusetts and was returned in 2009. Finally, on 23 October 2010, a relighting ceremony took place.

Structure
The building is made of brown granite. The lighthouse does not have a foghorn.

A wind generator and solar panels provide much of the power for the building.

See also

Block Island Southeast Light
National Register of Historic Places listings in Washington County, Rhode Island

References

External links

Lighthouse pics and info
Lighthouse Friend information and photos

Lighthouses in Washington County, Rhode Island
Lighthouse museums in Rhode Island
Museums in Washington County, Rhode Island
New Shoreham, Rhode Island
Lighthouses completed in 1867
Lighthouses on the National Register of Historic Places in Rhode Island
National Register of Historic Places in Washington County, Rhode Island
1867 establishments in Rhode Island